The Plebeian (Spanish: El plebeyo) is a 1953 Mexican drama film directed by Miguel M. Delgado and starring Rosita Arenas, Raúl Martínez and Chula Prieto.

Cast

References

Bibliography 
 María Luisa Amador. Cartelera cinematográfica, 1950-1959. UNAM, 1985.

External links 
 

1953 films
1953 drama films
Mexican drama films
1950s Spanish-language films
Films directed by Miguel M. Delgado
Mexican black-and-white films
1950s Mexican films